The 1976 Northern Iowa Panthers football team represented the University of Northern Iowa as a member of the North Central Conference (NCC) during the 1976 NCAA Division II football season . Led by 17th-year head coach Stan Sheriff, the Panthers compiled an overall record of 8–3 record with a mark of 4–2 in conference play, placing third in the NCC. Northern Iowa played home games at UNI-Dome in Cedar Falls, Iowa.

Schedule

References

Northern Iowa
Northern Iowa Panthers football seasons
Northern Iowa Panthers football